Nalagarh Assembly constituency is one of the 68 assembly constituencies of Himachal Pradesh a northern Indian state. Nalagarh is also part of Shimla Lok Sabha constituency.

Members of Legislative Assembly

^: By-election

Election candidate

2022

Election results

2017

2012

2011 by-polls

2007

See also
 List of constituencies of the Himachal Pradesh Legislative Assembly
 Solan district
 Nalagarh

References

External links
 

Kullu district
Assembly constituencies of Himachal Pradesh